The 2018 UCI Track Cycling World Championships were the World Championships for track cycling in 2018. They took place in the Netherlands at the Omnisport Apeldoorn from 28 February to 4 March 2018.

Schedule
The schedule of events was as follows:

Medal summary

Medal table

Medalists

Notes
Riders named in italics did not participate in the medal finals.
 Contested in the Olympics as an intra-omnium discipline only.
 Not contested in the Olympics.

References

External links
Official website
Official live timing

 
UCI Track Cycling World Championships
UCI Track Cycling World Championships
2018
2018 UCI Track Cycling World Championships
UCI Track Cycling World Championships
UCI Track Cycling World Championships
Cycling in Apeldoorn